Possession Island may refer to:

 Possession Island (Namibia), on the Skeleton Coast of Africa, largest within the Penguin Islands
 Possession Island (Queensland), in the Torres Strait, Australia
 Possession Island, Antarctica, in the Possession Islands group
 Île de la Possession, a French subantarctic territory
 "Possession Island", a song by Gorillaz from their 2023 album Cracker Island

See also
 Possession Islands, Antarctica